The Cantons of Togo are the third-level administrative units of the country, after regions and prefectures; which in turn they are subdivided into villages. They are similar to communes or sub-districts or sub-prefectures of other French African nations.

As of 2013 there were 387 cantons, grouped within 35 prefectures. However, as of May 2019, there are 394 cantons, grouped within 39 prefectures.

Centrale Region
 05 Prefectures; 61 Cantons

Blitta Prefecture
 Capital: Blitta–Gare; 21 Cantons

 Canton of Blitta–Gare
 Canton of Agbandi
 Canton of Atchintsé
 Canton of Blitta–Village
 Canton of Diguengué
 Canton of Dikpéléou
 Canton of Doufouli
 Canton of Katchenké
 Canton of Koffiti
 Canton of Langabou
 Canton of M’Poti
 Canton of Pagala–Gare
 Canton of Pagala–Village
 Canton of Tchaloudè
 Canton of Tcharé–Baou
 Canton of Tchifama
 Canton of Tintchro
 Canton of Waragni
 Canton of Welly
 Canton of Yaloumbé
 Canton of Yégué

Mô Prefecture
 Capital: Djarkpanga; 05 Cantons

 Canton of Djarkpanga
 Canton of Boulohou
 Canton of Kagnigbara
 Canton of Saïboudè
 Canton of Tindjassi

Sotouboua Prefecture
 Capital: Sotouboua; 12 Cantons

 Canton of Sotouboua
 Canton of Adjengré
 Canton of Aouda
 Canton of Bodjondé
 Canton of Fazao
 Canton of Kaniamboua
 Canton of Kazaboua
 Canton of Sassaro
 Canton of Tabindè
 Canton of Tchébébé
 Canton of Titigbé
 Canton of Kériadè

Tchamba Prefecture
 Capital: Tchamba; 10 Cantons

 Canton of Tchamba
 Canton of Adjéidè (Kri–Kri)
 Canton of Affem
 Canton of Alibi
 Canton of Bago
 Canton of Balanka
 Canton of Goubi
 Canton of Kaboli
 Canton of Koussountou
 Canton of Larini

Tchaoudjo Prefecture
 Capital: Sokode; 13 Cantons

 Canton of Komah
 Canton of Agoulou
 Canton of Aléhéridè
 Canton of Amaïdè
 Canton of Kadambara
 Canton of Kéméni
 Canton of Kolina
 Canton of Kpangalam
 Canton of Kparatao
 Canton of Kpassouadè
 Canton of Lama–Tessi
 Canton of Tchalo
 Canton of Wassarabo

Kara Region
 07 Prefectures; 75 Cantons

Assoli Prefecture
 Capital: Bafilo; 06 Cantons

 Canton of Bafilo
 Canton of Alédjo
 Canton of Bouladè
 Canton of Dako
 Canton of Koumondè
 Canton of Soudou

Bassar Prefecture
 Capital: Bassar; 10 Cantons

 Canton of Bassar
 Canton of Baghan
 Canton of Bangéli
 Canton of Bitchabé
 Canton of Dimouri
 Canton of Kabou
 Canton of Kalanga
 Canton of Manga
 Canton of Sanda–Afowou
 Canton of Sanda–Kagbanda

Binah Prefecture
 Capital: Pagouda; 09 Cantons

 Canton of Pagouda
 Canton of Boufalé
 Canton of Kémérida
 Canton of Kétao
 Canton of Lama–Dessi
 Canton of Pessaré
 Canton of Pitikita
 Canton of Sirka
 Canton of Solla

Dankpen Prefecture
 Capital: Guérin–Kouka; 12 Cantons

 Canton of Guérin–Kouka
 Canton of Bapuré
 Canton of Katchamba
 Canton of Kidjaboum
 Canton of Koulfièkou
 Canton of Koutchichéou
 Canton of Namon
 Canton of Nampoch
 Canton of Nandouta
 Canton of Natchiboré
 Canton of Natchitikpi
 Canton of Nawaré

Doufelgou Prefecture
 Capital: Niamtougou; 14 Cantons

 Canton of Niamtougou
 Canton of Agbandé–Yaka
 Canton of Alloum
 Canton of Baga
 Canton of Défalé
 Canton of Kadjalla
 Canton of Koka
 Canton of Kpaha
 Canton of Léon
 Canton of Massédéna
 Canton of Pouda
 Canton of Siou
 Canton of Tchoré
 Canton of Ténéga

Kéran Prefecture
 Capital: Kéran; 09 Cantons

 Canton of Kantè
 Canton of Akponté
 Canton of Atalotè
 Canton of Hélota
 Canton of Ossacré
 Canton of Pessidè
 Canton of Tamberma–Est (Koutougou)
 Canton of Tamberma–Ouest (Nadoba)
 Canton of Warengo

Kozah Prefecture
 Capital: Kara; 15 Cantons

 Canton of Lama-Kara (Kara)
 Canton of Atchangbadè
 Canton of Awandjélo
 Canton of Bohou
 Canton of Djamdè
 Canton of Kouméa
 Canton of Landa
 Canton of Landa–Kpinzindè
 Canton of Lassa
 Canton of Pya
 Canton of Sarakawa
 Canton of Soumdina
 Canton of Tcharé
 Canton of Tchitchao
 Canton of Yadé

Maritime Region
 08 Prefectures; 74 Cantons

Avé Prefecture
 Capital: Kévé; 09 Cantons

 Canton of Kévé
 Canton of Aképé
 Canton of Ando
 Canton of Assahoun
 Canton of Badja
 Canton of Noépé
 Canton of Tovégan
 Canton of Zolo
 Canton of Edji

Bas-Mono Prefecture
 Capital: Afagnagan; 07 Cantons

 Canton of Afagnagan
 Canton of Afagnan–Gbléta
 Canton of Agbétiko
 Canton of Agomé–Glouzou
 Canton of Attitogon
 Canton of Hompou
 Canton of Kpétsou

Agoé–Nyivé Prefecture
 Capital: Agoé–Nyivé; 6 Cantons

 Canton of Agoè–Nyivé
 Canton of AdétikopéZio
 Canton of Légbassito
 Canton of Sanguéra
 Canton of Togblékopé
 Canton of Vakpossito

Golfe Prefecture
 Capital: Lome; 5 Cantons

 Canton of Amoutivé
 Canton of Aflao–Gakli
 Canton of Aflao–Sagbado
 Canton of Baguida
 Canton of Bè

Lacs Prefecture
 Capital: Aného; 09 Cantons

 Ville of Aného (Adjigo)
 Ville of Aného (Lawson)
 Canton of Agbodrafo
 Canton of Agouègan
 Canton of Aklakou
 Canton of Anfoin
 Canton of Fiata
 Canton of Ganavé
 Canton of Glidji

Vo Prefecture
 Capital: Vogan; 10 Cantons

 Canton of Vogan
 Canton of Akoumapé
 Canton of Anyronkopé
 Canton of Dagbati
 Canton of Dzrékpo
 Canton of Hahotoé
 Canton of Momé–Hounkpati
 Canton of Sévagan
 Canton of Togoville
 Canton of Vo–Koutimé

Yoto Prefecture
 Capital: Tabligbo; 12 Cantons

 Canton of Tabligbo
 Canton of Ahépé
 Canton of Amoussimé
 Canton of Essè–Godjin
 Canton of Gboto
 Canton of Kini–Kondji
 Canton of Kouvé
 Canton of Sédomé
 Canton of Tchêkpo
 Canton of Tokpli
 Canton of Tométy–Kondji
 Canton of Zafi

Zio Prefecture
 Capital: Tsevie; 16 Cantons

 Canton of Tsévié
 Canton of Abobo
 Canton of Agbélouvé
 Canton of Bolou
 Canton of Dalavé
 Canton of Davié
 Canton of Djagblé
 Canton of Gamé–Sèva
 Canton of Gapé–Centre
 Canton of Gapé–Kpodji
 Canton of Gbatopé
 Canton of Gblainvié
 Canton of Kovié
 Canton of Kpomé
 Canton of Mission–Tové
 Canton of Wli

Plateaux Region
 12 Prefectures; 113 Cantons

Agou Prefecture
 Capital: Agou–Gadjepe; 13 Cantons

 Canton of Agou–Tavié: (Reine Mère of village of Agou–Koumawou)
 Canton of Agotimé–Nord
 Canton of Agotimé–Sud
 Canton of Agou–Akplolo
 Canton of Agou–Atigbé
 Canton of Agou–Iboè
 Canton of Agou–Kébo
 Canton of Agou–Nyogbo
 Canton of Agou–Nyogbo–Agbétiko
 Canton of Amoussoukopé
 Canton of Assahoun–Fiagbé
 Canton of Gadja
 Canton of Kati

Akébou Prefecture
 Capital: Kougnohou; 08 Cantons

 Canton of Kougnohou (Akébou)
 Canton of Djon
 Canton of Gbendé
 Canton of Kamina–Akébou
 Canton of Kpalavé
 Canton of Sérégbéné
 Canton of Vèh
 Canton of Yalla

Amou Prefecture
 Capital: Amlamé; 14 Cantons

 Canton of Ouma (Amlamé)
 Canton of Adiva
 Canton of Amou–Oblo
 Canton of Avédji–Itadi
 Canton of Ekpégnon
 Canton of Evou
 Canton of Gamé
 Canton of Hihéatro
 Canton of Ikponou (Akposso–Nord) Otadi
 Canton of Imlé
 Canton of Kpatégan
 Canton of Logbo (Témédja)
 Canton of Okpahoé
 Canton of Sodo

Anié Prefecture
 Capital: Anié; 06 Cantons

 Canton of Anié
 Canton of Adogbénou
 Canton of Atchinèdji
 Canton of Glitto
 Canton of Kolo–Kopé
 Canton of Pallakoko

Danyi Prefecture
 Capital: Danyi–Apeyeme; 06 Cantons

 Canton of Danyi–Atigba
 Canton of Ahlon
 Canton of Danyi–Elavagnon
 Canton of Danyi–Kakpa
 Canton of Danyi–Kpéto–Evita
 Canton of Yikpa

Est-Mono Prefecture
 Capital: Elavagnon; 07 Cantons

 Canton of Elavagnon
 Canton of Badin–Copé
 Canton of Gbadjahè
 Canton of Kamina
 Canton of Kpéssi
 Canton of Morétan–Igbérioko
 Canton of Nyamassila

Haho Prefecture
 Capital: Notsé; 10 Cantons

 Canton of Notsé
 Canton of Assrama
 Canton of Atsavé
 Canton of Ayito (Kpégnon–Adja)
 Canton of Dalia
 Canton of Djéméni
 Canton of Kpédomé
 Canton of Wahala
 Canton of Akpakpapé
 Canton of Hahomégbé

Kloto Prefecture
 Capital: Kpalimé; 14 Cantons

 Canton of Kpalimé
 Canton of Agomé–Tomégbé
 Canton of Agomé–Yoh
 Canton of Gbalavé
 Canton of Hanyigba
 Canton of Kpadapé
 Canton of Kpimé
 Canton of Kuma
 Canton of Lanvié
 Canton of Lavié–Apédomé
 Canton of Tomé
 Canton of Tové
 Canton of Woamé
 Canton of Yokélé

Kpélé Prefecture
 Capital: Kpélé–Adeta; 09 Cantons

 Canton of Kpélé–Akata
 Canton of Kpélé–Dawlotu
 Canton of Kpélé–Dutoè
 Canton of Kpélé–Gbalédzé
 Canton of Kpélé–Goudévé
 Canton of Kpélé–Govié
 Canton of Kpélé–Kamè
 Canton of Kpélé–Nord
 Canton of Kpélé–Novivé

Moyen-Mono Prefecture
 Capital: Tohoun; 06 Cantons

 Canton of Tohoun
 Canton of Ahassomé
 Canton of Katomé
 Canton of Kpékplémé
 Canton of Saligbè
 Canton of Tado

Ogou Prefecture
 Capital: Atakpame; 08 Cantons

 Canton of Gnagna
 Canton of Akparé
 Canton of Datcha
 Canton of Djama
 Canton of Gléï
 Canton of Katoré
 Canton of Ountivou
 Canton of Woudou

Wawa Prefecture
 Capital: Badou; 12 Cantons

 Canton of Badou
 Canton of Doumé
 Canton of Ekéto
 Canton of Gbadi–N’Kugna
 Canton of Gobé
 Canton of Késsibo
 Canton of Klabè–Efoukpa
 Canton of Kpété–Bena
 Canton of Okou
 Canton of Ounabé
 Canton of Tomégbé
 Canton of Zogbégan

Savanes Region
 07 Prefectures; 69 Cantons

Cinkassé Prefecture
 Capital: Cinkassé; 08 Cantons

 Canton of Cinkassé
 Canton of Biankouri
 Canton of Boadé
 Canton of Gouloungoussi
 Canton of Nadjoundi
 Canton of Noaga
 Canton of Samnaba
 Canton of Timbou

Kpendjal Prefecture
 Capital: Mandouri; 4 Cantons

 Canton of Mandouri
 Canton of Borgou
 Canton of Koundjoaré
 Canton of Tambigou

Kpendjal-Ouest Prefecture
 Capital: Naki–Est; 7 Cantons

 Canton of Naki–Est
 Canton of Namondjoga
 Canton of Nayéga
 Canton of Ogaro
 Canton of Papri
 Canton of Pogno
 Canton of Tambonga

Oti Prefecture
 Capital: Sansanne–Mango; 8 Cantons

 Canton of Mango
 Canton of Barkoissi
 Canton of Faré
 Canton of Galangashie
 Canton of Loko
 Canton of Nagbéni
 Canton of Sadori
 Canton of Tchanaga

Oti-Sud Prefecture
 Capital: Gando; 8 Cantons

 Canton of Gando
 Canton of Koumongou
 Canton of Kountoiré
 Canton of Mogou
 Canton of Nali
 Canton of Sagbièbou
 Canton of Takpamba
 Canton of Tchamonga

Tandjouaré Prefecture
 Capital: Tandjouare; 16 Cantons

 Canton of Bogou
 Canton of Bagou
 Canton of Bombouaka
 Canton of Boulogou
 Canton of Doukpergou
 Canton of Goundoga
 Canton of Loko
 Canton of Lokpanou
 Canton of Mamproug
 Canton of Nandoga
 Canton of Nano
 Canton of Pligou
 Canton of Sangou
 Canton of Sissiak
 Canton of Tamongou
 Canton of Tampialime

Tone Prefecture
 Capital: Dapaong; 18 Cantons

 Canton of Dapaong
 Canton of Bidjenga
 Canton of Kantindi
 Canton of Korbongou
 Canton of Kourientré
 Canton of Lotogou
 Canton of Louanga
 Canton of Naki–Ouest
 Canton of Namaré
 Canton of Nanergou
 Canton of Natigou
 Canton of Nioukpourma
 Canton of Pana
 Canton of Poissongui
 Canton of Sanfatoute
 Canton of Tami
 Canton of Toaga
 Canton of Warkambou

References

External links
List of cantons 

 
Subdivisions of Togo
Third-level administrative divisions by country